Abralia marisarabica is a species of enoploteuthid cephalopod that is endemic to the Arabian Sea. It may also be present in the Seychelles. It is one of the smallest Abralia species, growing to 19–22 mm (males) and 22–26 mm (females) in mantle lengths. There appears to be sexual dimorphism in the number of arm hooks present.

References

Further reading
 
 

Abralia
Molluscs described in 1983